The idea of bootstrapping is significant in a number of fields in the biological sciences. The process by which a fertilised ovum develops into an embryo, particularly the way in which the nuclear genome is expressed differently in its various cells as these differentiate, is one example of bootstrapping. The evolution of progressively better adapted organs through natural selection in a lineage of organisms is another.

Some biologists, including Graham Cairns-Smith, believe that the origin of life itself may have been a bootstrap process as one or more systems of biological information storage formed the foundation for successor systems that ultimately supplanted them culminating in the emergence of our current DNA-based system.

See also
embryology
ontogeny and phylogeny
RNA World

Embryology